Antonín Prachař (born December 14, 1962, Uherské Hradiště, Czech Republic) is a Czech politician and transport expert, formerly vice president of the Czech Association of Road Transport Operators (ČESMAD BOHEMIA). He was the Czech Minister of Transport in the government of Bohuslav Sobotka from January to November 2014.

References 

1962 births
Living people
People from Uherské Hradiště
Transport ministers of the Czech Republic
ANO 2011 Government ministers